Mariehem is a residential area in Umeå, Sweden. It is located about 4 km outside the central city, next to the lake Nydalasjön.

The area was built in the 1960s and consist primarily of rental apartments and condominium apartments.

Sports
The following sports clubs are located in Mariehem:
 Mariehem SK

References

External links

Mariehem at Umeå Municipality

Umeå